The 46th Infantry Division was an infantry division of the German Army during World War II that fought on the Eastern Front.

History

The 46th Infantry Division was formed in 1938 under the command of General Paul von Hase. It fought in the invasion of Poland in 1939, and the following year participated in the Battle of France. It remained there into 1941 and then participated in the invasion of Yugoslavia in April.  During the invasion of the Soviet Union, it was attached to Army Group South and marched through Ukraine and into the Crimea.

In December 1941 it was engaged in heavy fighting in the Kerch Peninsula in December. Despite being instructed to hold its ground, the XXXXII Army Corps commander, General von Sponeck, gave the order to pull back. This order was countermanded by the 11th Army commander, Erich von Manstein, but since von Sponeck had already disassembled his wireless set, the order to hold ground was not received. The division avoided encirclement and eventually helped stem the tide of the Red Army landings at Feodosiya.

The withdrawal of the division infuriated the commander of Army Group South, Field Marshal Walther von Reichenau, and on Hitler's orders, Sponeck was dismissed. The division's commander, General Kurt Himer, was also relieved of his command, and Reichenau ordered the division to be stripped of its honors.

After the death of Reichenau two weeks later, his successor Fedor von Bock restored Himer to command along with the division's honours (Himer was mortally wounded in March 1942 and succeeded as commander by General Ernst Haccius). It participated in the Siege of Sevastopol and in the fighting in the Caucasus in the winter of 1942–43. As the tide of the war turned against the Germans, the division was forced to gradually retreat through Ukraine. By September 1943, its strength was considerably reduced and by late 1944, having made a fighting retreat through Transylvania and the Carpathian Mountains and engaged in action on the Slovakian-Hungarian front, it was effectively at regimental strength.

In March 1945, the division was designated a Volksgrenadier formation, the 46th Volksgrenadier Division. With its numbers depleted, the division surrendered to the Soviets in May 1945.

Commanding officers
Generalleutnant Paul von Hase (24 September 1938 – 24 July 1940)
Generalleutnant Karl Kriebel (24 July 1940 – 17 September 1941)
Generalleutnant  (17 September 1941 – 26 March 1942)
Generalmajor (Generalleutnant) Ernst Haccius (5 April 1942 – 7 February 1943)
General Arthur Hauffe (7 February 1943 – 13 February 1943)
General Karl von Le Suire (13 February 1943 – 27 February 1943)
General Arthur Hauffe (27 February 1943 – 20 August 1943)
General Kurt Röpke (20 August 1943 – 10 July 1944)
Oberst Curt Ewrigmann (10 July 1944 – 26 August 1944)
Generalleutnant Erich Reuter (26 August 1944 – 8 May 1945)

Notes

References

0*046
Military units and formations established in 1938
Military units and formations disestablished in 1945